Frog End is the name of two hamlets in South Cambridgeshire, themselves within the villages of:
Haslingfield 
Shepreth

Hamlets in Cambridgeshire
South Cambridgeshire District